Toleria is a genus of moths in the family Sesiidae.

Species

 Toleria abiaeformis Walker, [1865]
 Toleria aegerides (Strand, [1916])
 Toleria aritai Ogane & Kallies, 2020
 Toleria colochelyna (Bryk, 1947)
 Toleria ilana Arita & Gorbunov, 2001
 Toleria sinensis (Walker, [1865])
 Toleria vietnamica Gorbunov & Arita, 2020

References

Sesiidae